The Anthracite Range is a mountain range in the West Elk Mountains, a sub-range of the Rocky Mountains of North America. The range is located in Gunnison County of western Colorado and lies within the West Elk Wilderness of the Gunnison National Forest. The Anthracite Range is one of several prominent laccoliths found in the West Elk Mountains.

Geology
The Anthracite Range is a laccolith, formed  when magma intruded into sedimentary strata of the Mesaverde Formation approximately 30 million years ago. Subsequent erosion has removed the softer, overlying sedimentary rock thereby exposing the more resistant igneous rock that characterizes the mountain today. The range is composed of quartz monzonite porphyry and granodiorite porphyry. The Anthracite Range was glaciated, and the most prominent glacial cirques are located on the north and east sides of the range.

The range is named after anthracite, a high-quality, metamorphized coal found in the sedimentary rock of the Mesaverde Formation at the base of this and nearby laccoliths.

Summits

From west to east, these summits include: the Anthracite Range High Point (elevation  ), prominence ); Unnamed Peak 12,300 (elevation ); Ohio Peak (elevation ); and Unnamed Peak  11,555 (elevation ). These summits are most often accessed from Ohio Pass where a climber's trail enters the wilderness area, traverses southwest across talus slopes then up through a cirque to the ridge just west of Unnamed Peak 11,555. From there, the summits are reached by hiking along the ridge.

Gallery

See also
List of the most prominent summits of Colorado

References

External links
 
Anthracite Range High Point on listsofjohn.com
Anthracite Range on peakbagger.com
Anthracite Range/Ohio Peak on summitpost.com

 
Mountains of Gunnison County, Colorado
Landforms of Gunnison County, Colorado
Gunnison National Forest
Colorado Western Slope
 Mountains of Colorado
 Laccoliths